The Arch of Janus is the only quadrifrons triumphal arch preserved in Rome. It was set up at a crossroads at the northeastern limit of the Forum Boarium, close to the Velabrum, over the Cloaca Maxima drain that went from the Forum to the River Tiber.

History
It was built in the early 4th century AD, using spolia, i.e. material from earlier buildings, including bricks, together with pottery shards, and was covered with white marble, also from earlier buildings. The exact significance of the arch is poorly understood: it is thought to have been a boundary marker rather than a triumphal arch. An alternative view is that it was built to provide shelter for the traders at the Forum Boarium cattle market. Some researchers believe it was dedicated to Constantine I or Constantius II and was known as the Arch of the deified Constantine. It is 16 meters high and 12 meters wide.

Each pier of the arch has two rows of three niches. It seems logical that statues would have filled these 48 niches but none has been identified. The stone at the apex of the central arch on the north side is thought to depict Minerva, although others believe it may be Palladium. Its current name probably dates from the Renaissance or later, and was not used to describe it in classical antiquity. The name is derived from the structure's four-fronted, four-arched configuration. The ancient Roman god Janus (Ianus Quadrifons), was sometimes depicted with four faces and there are  Janus-related structures mentioned in historic descriptions of ancient Rome.

In the Middle Ages, the Frangipane family transformed the building into a fortress, and so it survived intact until 1830. Then, the attic and top were torn down because they were erroneously believed to not belong to the original structure. However, there is a staircase within the north-west pier which would have given access to this top floor. Iron pins originally held together the marble blocks but were removed in the Middle Ages, leading to the monument's present pock-marked look. Fragments of the dedicatory inscription are still preserved inside the nearby church of San Giorgio in Velabro.

The arch has not been accessible to the public since the explosion of a bomb in front of San Giorgio in Velabro, on the night of 27 July 1993.  It is the one monument of the Forum Boarium that remains unrestored. The Arch of Malborghetto, just outside Rome, also includes the remnants of a former Roman quadrifons arch.

See also

List of Roman triumphal arches
List of ancient monuments in Rome

References

External links
 Rome Art Lover
 High-resolution 360° Panoramas and Images of Arch of Janus | Art Atlas
 The Arch of Janus 
 https://www.wmf.org/project/arch-janus
 

Buildings and structures completed in the 4th century
Janus
Rome R. XII Ripa